Jac Price (born 4 August 2000) is a Welsh rugby union player who plays for United Rugby Championship side Scarlets. His preferred position is lock.

Professional career
Carmarthen–born Price attended Ysgol Bro Myrddin, and began his rugby career with local team Carmarthen Quins. He played for the Quins through all age grade levels, and represented their first team before featuring for the Scarlets.

In 2019, Price was selected for Wales U20 for the 2019 Six Nations Under 20s Championship. He was suspended after the first round, missing the following two matches. Price was selected for the 2019 World Rugby Under 20 Championship, and the 2020 Six Nations Under 20s Championship.

Price signed his first professional contract for Scarlets in August 2020. He made his Scarlets debut in Round 5 of the 2020–21 Pro14 against Zebre. In March 2021, Price joined Nottingham R.F.C. on loan, along with fellow Scarlets Harri O'Connor and Shaun Evans. Price made five appearances for the side, before returning to the Scarlets for the Pro14 Rainbow Cup.

References

External links
itsrugby.co.uk profile
Scarlets profile

2000 births
Living people
Rugby union locks
Rugby union players from Carmarthen
Scarlets players
Welsh rugby union players
Nottingham R.F.C. players